Miller Township may refer to:

Arkansas
 Miller Township, Cleveland County, Arkansas, in Cleveland County, Arkansas
 Miller Township, Franklin County, Arkansas, in Franklin County, Arkansas

Illinois
 Miller Township, LaSalle County, Illinois

Indiana
 Miller Township, Dearborn County, Indiana

Iowa
 Miller Township, Woodbury County, Iowa

Missouri
 Miller Township, Dallas County, Missouri
 Miller Township, Douglas County, Missouri, in Douglas County, Missouri
 Miller Township, Gentry County, Missouri
 Miller Township, Maries County, Missouri
 Miller Township, Marion County, Missouri
 Miller Township, Phelps County, Missouri
 Miller Township, Scotland County, Missouri

Nebraska
 Miller Township, Knox County, Nebraska

Ohio
 Miller Township, Knox County, Ohio

Pennsylvania
 Miller Township, Huntingdon County, Pennsylvania
 Miller Township, Perry County, Pennsylvania

South Dakota
 Miller Township, Hand County, South Dakota
 Miller Township, Marshall County, South Dakota, in Marshall County, South Dakota

Township name disambiguation pages